Giles Pollock Havergal CBE (born 9 June 1938, in Edinburgh) is a theatre director and actor, opera stage director, teacher, and adaptor. He was artistic director of Glasgow's Citizens Theatre from 1969 until he stepped down in 2003, one of the triumvirate of directors at the theatre, alongside Philip Prowse and Robert David MacDonald.

Early years
Giles Pollock Havergal was born in Edinburgh, Scotland to Dr. Henry MacLeod Havergal and his wife Hyacinth.

Career

Havergal was director of Watford Palace Theatre (1965–69) and director of the Citizens Theatre from 1969 to 2003. He directed over 80 plays in Glasgow including works by Shakespeare and Bertolt Brecht. He has also directed over 20 children and family Christmas productions, as well as guest-directing for companies including Scottish Opera, Welsh National Opera, Opera North, Shared Experience, 7.84, Wexford Festival Opera, Buxton Festival, Vancouver Opera, Minnesota Opera, Gelsenkirchen Opera, National Theatre Mannheim.

Havergal's production of Travels with My Aunt, adapted from the Graham Greene novel of the same title, was first presented in Glasgow in 1989 and then played in the West End where it won a Laurence Olivier Award in 1993, and off Broadway in 1995.

Havergal's production of his and Robert David Macdonald's adaptation of Death in Venice by Thomas Mann was first presented in Glasgow in 2000. It played at the Manhattan Ensemble Theatre, New York City in 2002, following performances in Stockholm, Copenhagen & Manchester (England). It was revived in 2005 at the American Conservatory Theater, San Francisco.

Havergal was the recipient of the 1994 St Mungo Prize, awarded to the individual who has done most in the previous three years to improve and promote the city of Glasgow.

Recent Years

In recent years Giles has directed Jack and the Beanstalk at the Barbican Centre, The Merry Widow (2010, 2019) and Albert Herring (2013) at Opera North and played Nagg in Endgame at the American Conservatory Theater, San Francisco.

He also teaches at Royal Conservatoire of Scotland, RADA, The National Opera Studio and the American Conservatory Theater, San Francisco.

References

External links
 
 

1938 births
Living people
Commanders of the Order of the British Empire
Laurence Olivier Award winners
Scottish male stage actors
Theatre people from Glasgow
Theatre people from Edinburgh
Scottish theatre directors
British theatre directors